"Stand by Me" is the 18th episode of the fifth season of the American television medical drama, Grey's Anatomy and the show's 96th episode overall. Written by Zoanne Clack and directed by Jessica Yu, the episode was originally broadcast on the American Broadcasting Company (ABC) in the United States on March 19, 2009.  The initial airing was viewed by 14.36 million Americans and garnered a 4.9/12 Nielsen rating/share in the 18–49 demographic. The episode garnered many positive reviews from critics.

In the episode Izzie Stevens (Katherine Heigl) doesn't want to fight the brain tumor, despite Cristina Yang (Sandra Oh)'s efforts to help her. This starts affecting Cristina's surgery performance so she tells everyone and Izzie is admitted at the hospital as a patient. Mark Sloan (Eric Dane) has a big surgery going on a facial transplant and chooses Izzie and Lexie Grey (Chyler Leigh) to assist. Meredith Grey (Ellen Pompeo) and George O'Malley (T.R. Knight) look over the hospital with the interns creating chaos in the hospital due to a love fight.

Plot 
Izzie Stevens (Katherine Heigl) doesn't want to fight the brain tumor, despite Cristina Yang (Sandra Oh)'s efforts to help her. This starts affecting Cristina's surgery performance so she tells everyone and Izzie is admitted at the hospital as a patient. Mark Sloan (Eric Dane) has a big surgery going on a facial transplant and chooses Izzie and Lexie Grey (Chyler Leigh) to assist. Meredith Grey (Ellen Pompeo) and George O'Malley (T.R. Knight) look over the hospital with the interns creating chaos in the hospital due to a love fight.

Title reference
This episode's title refers to the song, "Stand by Me", by American soul singer Ben E. King.

Reception
The episode received praise from television critics for the developments of both Izzie and Derek's story-arcs and the performance of the cast. Alan Sepinwall wrote, "it feels like this season has finally taken a turn for the better, with "Stand By Me" being the first episode since very early in the season that I liked pretty much unreservedly." He further added, "Izzie's illness is now being taken seriously by the show and its characters, and I liked seeing Yang struggle to keep the secret, to the point of almost messing up her first solo surgery. And Justin Chambers and Chandra Wilson did a great job acting with their eyes when Cristina spilled the beans in the operating room."

He went on to praise Derek Shepherd's story and wrote, "Derek's story was maybe the strongest part of the episode, as his sense of helplessness slowly engulfed first Callie Torres, then Owen Hunt, a set of characters we've rarely seen spend much time together before. And that in turn led to the Chief coming in for an emotional ass-kicking, which has always been one of James Pickens Jr. specialties and  gave Meredith the opportunity to make a very mature and well-phrased argument for why he needs to get." He also gave a positive review to the story-arc for the interns saying, "I also thought the interns were better used here than they've been at any point to date."

BuddyTV lauded Sandra Oh and Katherine Heigl saying, "Cristina finds Izzie sitting outside in the rain. She tells her that she told Bailey and Alex. She says emotionally that she wants Izzie to fight. Sandra and Katherine both are making me bawl like a baby." and added, "As Meredith voiceovers about mortality and borrowed time and whether it's worthwhile to make friends when everyone dies, all of Izzie's friends gather around her and help her into a hospital bed. Derek decides that he wants to be a surgeon after all and starts poring over Izzie's brain scans. And I look for a tissue. There's something in my eye." The site also praised the development of Mark Sloan and Lexie Grey saying, "They are beautiful, just like Blowhole and orchids, and they can adapt to a hostile environment."

CinemaBlend wrote, "This week’s episode was full of drama. We get to meet the son of Two-Face. Cristina gets her first solo surgery. Everyone finally finds out that Izzie has cancer. After almost bringing all of Seattle Grace down into his depression, Derek may finally be snapping out of it. Also, an intern is pregnant!" and praising the closing sequence added, "As the show closes, the central group checks Izzie into the hospital and begin running tests while Derek sits back at his trailer and examines Izzie’s brain scan results. Justin Chambers pulls off some very nice subtle acting as Alex helps Izzie and seems very in-control until you get a look at his eyes and see that he’s absolutely terrified."

PopSugar also gave a positive review saying, "Izzie deals with her diagnosis and Derek remains in the woods, unable to face the hospital where his last mistake took a life. I loved the way this episode brings the characters together in botched but earnest efforts to support each other. That final scene with Izzie in the hospital gown, surrounded by her friends, is classic Grey's." Also praising Pompeo and Knight's story arc the site added, "Meredith and George's plotline with the interns cracked me up, both for the way it mirrored the larger stories and for the fact that maybe, just maybe, they realize this is how ridiculous they looked when they were sex-crazed, angsty interns, too."

References

External links
 

Grey's Anatomy (season 5) episodes
2009 American television episodes